John Ashley may refer to:

John Ashley (actor) (1934–1997), American actor, producer and singer
John Ashley (priest) (19th century), Anglican priest
John Ashley (ice hockey) (1930–2008), Canadian ice hockey referee
John Ashley (bandit) (1888 or 1895–1924), American outlaw, bank robber, bootlegger and pirate
John Ashley (musician) (c. 1734–1805), English musician
John James Ashley (1772–1815), English musician
John Ashley (Bath musician) (c. 1760–1830), bassoonist, singer and songwriter

See also
John Astley (disambiguation)